WVOJ (1570 kHz) is a commercial AM radio station, licensed to Fernandina Beach, Florida, and serving the Jacksonville metropolitan area.  The station is currently owned by Norsan Consulting And Management, Inc.  WVOJ airs a Regional Mexican radio format, largely simulcast with several other radio stations in the Southern U. S., including North Carolina and South Carolina.

WVOJ broadcasts at 10,000 watts by day, but because AM 1570 is a clear channel frequency, WVOJ must reduce its power at night to only 30 watts to avoid interfering with other radio stations.  1570 AM is a Mexican clear-channel frequency, on which XERF-AM in Ciudad Acuña is the dominant Class A station.

Programming is also heard on FM translator W222CL at 92.9 MHz.  The station uses its translator's frequency in its moniker "La Raza 92.9."  Norsan Consulting has an application with the Federal Communications Commission to move the AM station's city of license to Orange Park, Florida, increase its daytime to 50,000 watts and its nighttime power to 10,000 watts, using a directional antenna. The application is for a Class B license; it is currently Class D.

History
The station was first licensed on November 30, 1955. The station was assigned the call sign WHOG on July 9, 1981.  On October 19, 1990, the station changed its call letters to WQAI.  Then on January 30, 1998, to WYHI, again on June 25, 1999, to WGSR, on January 16, 2004, to WNNR, and finally 13 days later to the current WVOJ.

On January 11, 2017, WVOJ went silent.

As of February 15, 2019 WVOJ is licensed and operating (FCC database).

References

External links

Mexican-American culture in Florida
VOJ
Regional Mexican radio stations in the United States
VOJ
1955 establishments in Florida
Radio stations established in 1955